David L. Curtis (born February 4, 1947) is an American politician who served in the North Carolina Senate from the 44th district from 2013 to 2018.

He was defeated in the primary election in May 2018.

Rather than wait until the end of his term, Curtis resigned effective the end of the legislative term in June.

References

External links

1947 births
Living people
Republican Party North Carolina state senators
People from Mooresville, North Carolina